Lycée Français International Georges Pompidou (LFIGP) is a French international school with campuses in Dubai and Sharjah. It serves levels maternelle, through lycée (senior high school). As of the 2013–2014 school year the school had a total of 2,400 students.

Campuses
The school has a total of four campuses:
 Ruwayyah Elémentaire in Dubai Academic City, Dubai 
 Ruwayyah Secondaire in Dubai 
 The Oud Metha campus in Dubai serves maternelle students.
 The Sharjah campus

References

External links
 Lycée Français International Georges Pompidou 
 English information

International schools in Dubai
International schools in Sharjah (city)
French international schools in the United Arab Emirates
Educational institutions in Canada with year of establishment missing